The women's high jump event  at the 1998 European Athletics Indoor Championships was held on 28 February.

Results

References

Final results

High jump at the European Athletics Indoor Championships
High
1998 in women's athletics